Ucides cordatus, the swamp ghost crab (or caranguejo-uçá in Portuguese), is one of two species of crabs in the genus Ucides. This species of crab is native to many coasts off of the western Atlantic Ocean. It has been found to be native to areas as far as Florida, to as southern as Uruguay. U. cordatus  is especially noteworthy in the country in Brazil as it plays important roles in the economy and food resources at Brazil’s Atlantic borders.

Like most other crabs, U. cordatus  has two distinct pinchers for different uses. Its left sharp pincher functions to cut and feed and the other pincher, is much larger and used to crush objects. It has an oval back with a very unique color scheme. U. cordatus is one of many animals that have sexual dimorphism. Most noticeably, female crabs are larger than their male counter parts. Males have a flatter oval shaped back with a distinct light blue in the middle with a beige white encompassing its back. On the other hand, females have much larger bulbous backs. Their carapaces are a dull dark green with dark purple. Both genders legs are also a dark reddish purple.

Habitat 
Ucides cordatus is from the mangrove crab genus, and such are primarily found in mangrove forests. They are largely terrestrial, and will create their homes at the bases of trees in the form of burrows. These burrows have been seen to be as deep as  1.6 meters down. The burrows have been found to play an important role in balancing carbon dioxide in mangrove forests. The increase in sedimentary surface area allows for a greater area for oxidation to occur, especially during the rain season.

While it has been documented to eat animal remains, U. cordatus is primarily a herbivore. The diet of U. cordatus largely consists of mangrove litter (ie. leaves, bark, roots etc.). During the early months of its lifespan, the species feeds on polychaete worms and microorganisms found in the sediments. They purposely ingest sediments which they collect outside their burrows. It has been noted that U. cordatus prefers certain mangrove species. U. cordatus has been found to prefer Rhizophora mangle over Avicennia germinans, but the reasons for this preference is unknown.

On the other hand, U. cordatus  has few predators. Animals known to hunt U. cordatus  include, but are not limited: raccoons, monkeys, and hawks. With such few predators, populations of U. cordatus tend to grow quite well because of this. However, populations of  U. cordatus is also greatly exploited by locals, primarily in Brazil. The overall U. cordatus population has seen a steady decrease since 1988.

Unlike most animals, the proportion of genders within populations are skewed in favor of the males. Studies have found the ratio of females to males is 53-62% respectively.

Behavior 
Like many other crabs, U. cordatus will migrate during mating season, which occurs during the months of November to January. They will leave their burrows to reach the ocean coast. In doing so, they create the migration phenomenon known as “a andada” which is Portuguese for ‘the walking’. At the coast, the crabs will both mate and lay their eggs. At which point they return to their origin.

Conservation efforts 
Ucides cordatus can play important roles in determining and empirically quantifying successful mangrove reserves. They are well known for being a sentinel species, and efforts to determine their biological changes have been common methods by which researchers have determined effectiveness of reserves. Environmental changes such as increase of heavy metals, fertilizer runoff, and other xenobiotics have been correlated back to U. cordatus and their biological status.

There are also legal restrictions to capturing U. cordatus. Due to their popularity, and decreasing population sizes, some states of Brazil have enacted restrictions of the size of crabs people are allowed to hunt. States like Paraiba have laws preventing the capture of females crabs smaller than 4.5 cm. However, according to many gatherers, these laws are not entirely enforced.

References

Crustaceans described in 1763
Ocypodoidea
Arthropods of the Dominican Republic